Marcin Wasielewski (born 23 August 1994) is a Polish professional footballer who plays as a right-back for GKS Katowice.

Career
On 1 February 2018 he was loaned to II liga side Znicz Pruszków.

Career statistics

Club

References

External links

1994 births
Living people
Association football defenders
Polish footballers
Lech Poznań II players
Lech Poznań players
Znicz Pruszków players
Bruk-Bet Termalica Nieciecza players
GKS Katowice players
Ekstraklasa players
I liga players
II liga players
III liga players
Footballers from Poznań